Founded in 1977, Fallon Health (formerly Fallon Community Health Plan) is a Worcester, Massachusetts-based provider of health insurance and health care services. In partnership with Weinberg Campus, Fallon Health also operates Fallon Health Weinberg, a health insurance company based in Amherst, New York.

Products 
Fallon Health's product portfolio includes HMO, POS and PPO plans as well as Medicaid and Medicare Advantage plans. In addition, Fallon Health offers a Program of All-inclusive Care for the Elderly, called Summit ElderCare®, and a Medicare Advantage Special Needs Plan/Senior Care Options program, called NaviCare.

Fallon Health Weinberg offers a Program of All-Inclusive Care for the Elderly (PACE), a Managed Long Term Care (MLTC) plan and a Medicare Advantage Health Maintenance Organization Special Needs Plan (HMO SNP) to dual-eligible residents of the Western New York counties of Erie and Niagara.

References

External links
 

Health maintenance organizations
Medical and health organizations based in Massachusetts
Organizations established in 1977